Cool City Production Vol. 3 "Mai-K's Club Side" is a remix album by Japanese singer and songwriter Mai Kuraki and Japanese production team Cool City Production. It was released on April 24, 2002, by Tent House. The album contains remixes of tracks from her first three studio albums: Delicious Way (2000), Perfect Crime (2001) and Fairy Tale (2002) and her first English-language album Secret of My Heart.

Track listing

Release history

References

2002 remix albums
Mai Kuraki albums
Being Inc. albums